Anibar is an annual festival devoted to animated movies, held in Peja Kosovo. Its intent is to familiarize people from Kosovo with the latest global trends in animation. Its purpose is to help and encourage Kosovo youngsters to express themselves and their ideas through animation by discussing topics that they are passionate about. This way, they tend to bring out more topics and break civic apathy through cultural activism.

Anibar organization was founded in 2010 by a group of young art activists.

Anibar is working towards its overall goal with capacity-building activities, such as training seminars and workshops, film screenings, debates and other activities that provide more visibility for emerging artists.

A large group of youngsters is heavily involved in the planning, preparations, and operations of the festival.

Anibar has a camping area for its guests next to Rugova Gorge, while Peja Lumbardhi river passes to the right of the site. Besides the tents that are offered, other supplies are available at the site such as showers, sanitation, places to relax, food, drinks, and a swimming pool.

Thanks to Anibar festival many more animations are produced in Kosovo.

This festival occupies an irreplaceable niche in the Kosovo cultural scene.

History 

The Anibar Festival started in August 2010 on a budget of 500 euros and 80 films obtained from friends and acquaintances. In 2011, the Anibar Festival was officially represented at the annual Dok Leipzig festival in Germany.

The city cinema "Jusuf Gërvalla" was brought back into life in February 2011 and two years later the new mayor gave it to Anibar to administer.

In 2012, Anibar created its first Quick Response book to promote animators worldwide. The Anibar Film Book is an innovative, one-of-a-kind book created in a collaboration between the festival and Mad Artists Publishing in Canada. Along with information about the festival and past films, the book is encoded with QR codes that immediately link to  the films. The festival accepted approximately 150 films for official competition.

In 2013, approximately 140 films were accepted.

Nn the 5th edition held in 2014, the festival took over the city's old cinema. Peja has not had a working movie theatre since the equipment broke in the 1960s. The nearest cinema is in Pristina. an hour's drive away.

In 2018, 220 animated films were screened.

Program 
Films are divided into three categories: competitive program, special program and 'Kids for Kids Animations'. Admission to the competitions is open every year from January 30 to April 30.

Venues 
 Cinema-City "Jusuf Gërvalla" has a capacity of 300 seats, and features special programs and programs for children. Competitive films are screened daily.
 Cinema "Cubes"
 Istref Begolli theatre
 Cinema “lake” is an outdoor cinema by the lake, with 100 seats and inflatable boats.

Awards 
Anibar gives awards in different categories, such as:

 International Competition
 Student Competition
 Balkan Competition
 Feature Film Competition
 Music Video Competition
 Kids program
 Teens Programs
 Panorama Out of Competition
 Environmental Competition
 Animated Music Video Competition
 Audience Award Competition

Editions

2011

2012

2013

2016 
The event's 7th year took place from 15 to 21 August 2016 and was focused on the environment climate change.

2017 
This year Reclaim the City, was an official theme. Reclaim the City fought for democratic values in public space. Reclamation of public spaces will bring back the vibrancy of places filled with people and activities that represent a depoliticized culture and openness to new media.

2018 
The theme of 9th festival edition was Gender Equality and Women Empowerment.

During the festival, panel discussions addressed and promoted awareness. Anibar wanted to make a difference by inspiring women and men in animation to address gender inequality.

2019 
The theme of this year's festival was Hopes and Fears.

2020 
During the Covid-19 pandemic, Anibar was organised in the virtual format for the first time this year. This year's theme was Humans, through films, presentations, and panels that were broadcast throughout the weeks of the festival, the main focus was on the collective humanitarian effort, which has been highlighted even more because of the situation caused by COVID- 19.

2021 
After Covid, the Festival's theme was "Isolation". The theme reflected challenges of the COVID-19 pandemic and resulting solitude and claustrophobia. It included hybrid online and runs in-person events during July 23-30.

2022 
The theme of this year's festival was Superstitions.

References

External link

Animation film festivals
Organizations established in 2010
Film festivals in Kosovo
Summer events in Kosovo
2010 establishments in Kosovo